Félix Tomi (born 31 August 2000) is a French professional footballer who plays as a striker.

Career
Trained as a youth by AC Ajaccio, Tomi made his first team debut with the club in a 3–1 Ligue 2 win over US Orléans on 14 December 2018. He went on to make ten Ligue 2 appearances in the 2018–19 season, but was overlooked and had to play in the reserve team in Championnat National 3 in the 2019–20 season. In July 2020 he left AC Ajaccio and signed for Championnat National side Le Mans FC.

References

External links
 

2000 births
Living people
Association football forwards
French footballers
AC Ajaccio players
Le Mans FC players
Ligue 2 players
Championnat National players
Championnat National 3 players
Footballers from Corsica